Pojhi Kapoor (also Pojhikpur, Pojhikapur) is a village and part of Bhualpur Panchayat of Saran district, Bihar, India.

Geography 

It has an average elevation of 36 metres.

Location 

Pojhi Kapoor(Postal Code:841415) is about 15 km from district headquarters Chhapra. It falls under Bhualpur Panchayat of Marhaura Block of Saran district. Garkha is the nearest city. The village is well-connected by roads in all seasons. The nearest railway station is Chhapra(Station Code-CPR) and the nearest airport is Lok Nayak Jayaprakash Airport, Patna.

Development Works

Water supply pipelines: 
Village is equipped with pipelines for water supply. Public water taps has been also installed at few places. Village has been water rich but due to increasing population and lack of awareness for water conservation, water level goes down and due to which summers becoming hard for people nowadays. Most of hand pumps and wells dries during summer. However, supply of water is available periodically morning-evening but it is also subject to availability of electricity. One of the major issue which has been faced by farmers in past years was irrigation of crops because most of the existing old Pumps were not working at all due to Lack of Water level but this has been resolved a bit, because there are a few New Submersible Pumps installed in 2019 (private, with the help of Govt. subsidies), which allows farmers to irrigate their crops at lower rates than earlier.

Demographics 

 India census, Pojhi Kapoor had a population of 4254. Males constitute 55% of the population and females 45%.

Pojhi Kapoor and Pojhi Buzurg 
This Village has been historically divided in two parts. The western part of Pojhi is known as Pojhi Kapoor and the eastern part of the village is known as Pojhi Buzurg.

Healthcare 

There is a Government Primary Health Care Center, which is situated at Pojhi Kapoor providing round-the-clock medical service to the local population.
Electricity supply is available 24 Hours.

Schools
Pojhi Kapoor has three primary schools and one Higher Secondary School specially for girls affiliated to Bihar School Examination Board.
Sitaram Project Balika Uchhayatar(+2) Vidyalaya, Pojhi Kapoor
Prathmik Vidyalya, Pojhi Kapoor
Prathmik Kanya Vidyalya, Pojhi Buzurg
Prathmik Vidyalya, Pojhi Buzurg

Geographical Location

Gallery

Lal Babu Rai, Ex-MLA Marhaura, Leader Janata Dal (United)

References

Villages in Saran district